Nighat Seema was a Pakistani radio and film singer during the era of 60s and 70s. She is known for singing semi-classical songs, ghazals, and playback singing. She was the mother of music composer Ahsan Ali Taj.

Early life and family
Seema was born in Ajmer. She belonged to a Bengali family that had settled in Karachi.

Singing career
Seema was a radio singer who used to sing at different radio stations of East and West Pakistan. She got her musical training from the classical singer Tufail Niazi. Her career as a playback singer started with film Chhoti Behan that was released in 1964. She sang solo songs and also duets with Irene Perveen, Ahmed Rushdi,and Masood Rana for 37 Urdu and Punjabi movies.

Seema recorded many semi-classical songs, ghazals, patriotic songs, and Kalam-e-Iqbal for Radio Pakistan and Pakistan Television. Besides Urdu and Punjabi songs, she also vocalized songs in Bengali, Sindhi and Pashto languages.

Personal life
Seema was married to the folk singer Taj Multani who died in 2018. They both had a daughter named Sana Ali and a son named Ahsan Ali Taj who also adopted the singing career.

Death
Seema died on 4th April 2006 in Karachi. She was laid to rest in Wadi e Hussain Cemetery in Karachi.

Popular songs

Film
 1964 (Film: Chhoti Behan - Urdu) ... Ashkon Kay Diye, Sadqay Tujh Peh A Chand, Music: Lal Mohammad Iqbal, Poet: Sehba Akhtar, 
 1964 (Film: Chhoti Behan - Urdu) ... Geet Gati Hayn Khawabon Ki Parchhaian, Pyar Lenay Lag Phir Say, Singer(s): Nighat Seema, Masood Rana, Music: Lal Mohammad Iqbal, Poet: Masroor Anwar
 1964 (Film: Chhoti Behan - Urdu) ... Kali Hasraton Ki Na Khil Saki, Tera Pyar Ras Na Aa Saka, Singer(s): Nighat Seema, Masood Rana, Music: Lal Mohammad Iqbal, Poet: Masroor Anwar
 1968 (Film: Mahal - Urdu) ... Awaz Jab Bhi Den Ham, Pehchan Jayie Ga, Singer(s): Mehdi Hassan, Nighat Seema, Music: Rasheed Attray, Poet: Fyaz Hashmi
 1970 (Film: Jalay Na Kyun Parvana - Urdu) ... Jab Bhi Tumharay Husn Kay Jalway Bikhar Geye, Singer(s): Ahmad Rushdi, Nighat Seema, Music: Nashad, Poet: Taslim Fazli
 1971 (Film: Afshan - Urdu) ... Mili Hay Aaj Zamanay Ki Har Khushi Mujh Ko, Singer(s): Ahmad Rushdi, Nighat Seema, Music: Nashad, Poet: Taslim Fazli

Radio
 Wo Keh Gaye Thay Keh Aaen Gey Hum, Poet: Innam Bakhsh Nasikh
 Baat Karni Mujhe Mushkil Kabhi Aisi To Na Thi, Poet: Bahadur Shah Zafar
 Wo Harfe Raaz Keh Sikha Gaya Hai Mujh Ko Junoon, Poet: Allama Muhammad Iqbal
 Tu Abhi Reh Guzar Mein Hai Qaid e Maqam Se Guzar, Poet: Allama Muhammad Iqbal

Television
 Ye Kavita Pakistani Hai

References

External links
 

1946 births
Pakistani playback singers
Pakistani women singers
Pashto-language singers
2006 deaths
Bengali-language singers
Women ghazal singers
20th-century Pakistani women singers
Urdu-language singers
People from Ajmer
Pakistani people of Bengali descent
21st-century Pakistani women singers
Radio personalities from Lahore
Pakistani classical singers
Pakistani ghazal singers
Pakistani radio personalities
Punjabi-language singers
Sindhi-language singers